Laura Siegemund and Renata Voráčová were the defending champions, but both players chose not to participate.

Deborah Chiesa and Martina Colmegna won the title, defeating Cindy Burger and Stephanie Vogt in the final, 6–3, 1–6, [12–10].

Seeds

Draw

References 
 Draw

Internazionali Femminili di Brescia - Doubles